Robert R. Cupp (born November 9, 1950) is an American politician who served as the Speaker of the Ohio House of Representatives until December 31, 2022. He served in the House of Representatives from 2015, representing District 4 (Lima). He was elected as speaker on July 30, 2020, replacing Larry Householder who was removed from the position following his arrest on federal bribery charges.

Cupp is a former justice of the Ohio Supreme Court. He was elected November 7, 2006 to a six-year term and was sworn in on January 2, 2007. His term expired January 1, 2013 following his election loss to William O'Neill. Between Cupp's election and the death of Chief Justice Thomas Moyer in 2010, all the Justices of the Court were Republican. Before joining the Ohio Supreme Court, Cupp gained appellate judicial experience as a judge on the Ohio Court of Appeals (Third Judicial District) from 2003 to 2006.

Cupp was a member of the Ohio Senate for 16 years, 1985–2000, but was forced to retire due to legislative term limits. He was President Pro-Tem of the Senate from 1997 to 2000, the second highest-ranking leadership position in the Senate. During his time in the Senate, he spent ten years serving on the Judiciary Committee.

Cupp was a Lima prosecutor from 1976 to 1980 and was elected Allen County Commissioner twice, from 1981 to 1984 and 2000 to 2002.

Personal
Cupp is an alumnus of Ohio Northern University, from which he earned his degree in political science in 1973. He earned his J.D. from Ohio Northern University Pettit College of Law in 1976.

Cupp and his wife, Libby, have two sons.

2012 Election to the Ohio Supreme Court
The Columbus Dispatch, Cleveland Plain Dealer, Toledo Blade, and Youngstown Vindicator endorsed Robert Cupp for re-election in the November 6, 2012 election. Cupp and his opponent William O'Neill were both recommended for the 2012 Supreme Court election by the Ohio State Bar Association, and rated "excellent" by the Ohio Women's Bar Association

On November 6, 2012, Cupp lost his bid for re-election to O'Neill by a margin of 5%. Cupp would remain out of office for only two years, when he would run for his current seat in the Ohio House of Representatives.

Anti-vaccination controversy 
Sherri Tenpenny presented at a hearing with the Ohio House of Representatives regarding House Bill 248. In the hearing, Tenpenny pushed false claims that the COVID-19 vaccines contain metals bonded to the proteins which she claimed results in people becoming magnetized. Cupp defended the invitation to Tenpenny's testimony despite the lack of factual basis for her claims and despite the condemnation by the Ohio Osteopathic Association. Tenpenny's position was supported by testimony from Nurse Joanna Overholt who failed to demonstrate with a metal key the magnetism theory propounded by the Dr.

See also 
 Election Results, Ohio Supreme Court

References

External links 

1950 births
Living people
21st-century American judges
21st-century American politicians
Claude W. Pettit College of Law alumni
County commissioners in Ohio
Judges of the Ohio District Courts of Appeals
Justices of the Ohio Supreme Court
Republican Party members of the Ohio House of Representatives
Ohio Northern University alumni
Republican Party Ohio state senators
People from Bluffton, Ohio
Speakers of the Ohio House of Representatives